Buku Khamis (born 24 March 2000) is an Australian rules footballer playing for the Western Bulldogs in the Australian Football League. Khamis was born in Sudan (on land now part of South Sudan) but he and his family moved to Australia in 2006 as refugees. In the Victorian premier U19 competition he played for the Western Jets. Khamis was selected for play his first AFL match for the Western Bulldogs against Carlton Football Club on 7 May 2021.

Statistics
 Statistics are correct to the end of round 20 2022.

|- style="background-color: #EAEAEA"
! scope="row" style="text-align:center" | 2021
|
| 24 || 1 || 0 || 0 || 7 || 4 || 11 || 1 || 1 || 0.0 || 0.0 || 7.0 || 4.0 || 11.0 || 1.0 || 1.0
|- style="background-color: #EAEAEA"
! scope="row" style="text-align:center" | 2022
|
| 24 || 8 || 6 || 6 || 49 || 31 || 80 || 29 || 10 || 0.7 || 0.7 || 6.1 || 3.8 || 10.0 || 3.6 || 1.2
|- class="sortbottom"
! colspan=3| Career
! 9
! 6
! 6
! 56
! 35
! 91
! 30
! 11
! 0.6
! 0.6
! 6.2
! 3.8
! 10.1
! 3.3
! 1.2
|}

References

External links
 

 Western Region Football League player profile

Living people
2000 births
Western Bulldogs players
Western Jets players
South Sudanese emigrants to Australia
South Sudanese refugees
Australian rules footballers from Melbourne
South Sudanese players of Australian rules football